The Rt Hon. Richard Butler, 1st Earl of Glengall (13 November 1775 – 30 January 1819), known as The 10th Baron Cahir before 1816, was an Irish peer.

He was the son and heir of James Butler, 9th Baron Cahir, and Sarah Nicholls. In July 1788, he succeeded to his father's title and assumed his seat in the Irish House of Lords. Following the implementation of the Acts of Union in January 1801, Lord Cahir, as he then was styled, was elected as one of the original 28 Irish representative peers, and took his seat on the Tory benches in the British House of Lords. On 22 January 1816, he was created Viscount Cahir and Earl of Glengall, both titles in the Peerage of Ireland.

Marriage and issue

On 15 August 1793, the then Lord Cahir married Emily Jefferyes,  daughter of James St. John Jefferyes and Arabella FitzGibbon, sister of The 1st Earl of Clare. They had four children:

The Hon. Richard Butler (17 May 1794 – 22 June 1858), styled as Viscount Cahir between January 1816 and January 1819.
Lady Harriet Anne Butler (1 January 1799 – 14 September 1860), married The 3rd Marquess of Donegall
Lady Charlotte Butler Talbot (9 May 1809 – 22 March 1846), married Christopher Rice Mansel Talbot, M.P.
Lady Emily Georgina Arabella (1812 –), married firstly Richard Pennefather (died 1849); secondly, General Henry Aitchison Hankey

Lord Glengall was succeeded by his only son, Richard, Viscount Cahir.

References

1775 births
1819 deaths
Richard
Conservative Party (UK) hereditary peers
Earls in the Peerage of Ireland
Irish representative peers
Members of the Irish House of Lords